Philenoptera is a plant genus in the legume family (Fabaceae).

Species
There are some 6 species:
 Philenoptera bussei (Harms) Schrire
 Philenoptera cyanescens (Schum. & Thonn.) Roberty
 Philenoptera madagascariensis (Vatke) Schrire
 Philenoptera nelsii (Schinz) Schrire
 Philenoptera pallescens (Welw. ex Baker) Schrire
 Philenoptera violacea (Klotzsch) Schrire

References

Millettieae
Fabaceae genera